Mandy Mohamed (born 23 February 2000) is a Dutch-Egyptian artistic gymnast currently representing Egypt in international competitions.  She represented Egypt at the 2020 Olympic Games. She was a member of the team who won gold at the 2019 African Games and the 2016 African Championships.

Personal life 
Mohamed was born in Haarlem in 2000 to Egyptian parents. She speaks Arabic, Dutch, and English and was inspired by Dutch-born Egyptian gymnast Sherine El-Zeiny.

Gymnastics career

Junior

2014–15
Mohamed was a member of the Dutch junior national team. She competed at the Dutch Championships and placed fifth in the all-around. Additionally, she placed fourth on floor exercise and sixth on uneven bars and balance beam. In November, at the Dutch Team Championships, she helped her club finish third.

In 2015 Mohamed competed at the Flanders International Team Challenge in Ghent, where she helped the Netherlands finish seventh.

Senior

2016–17
Mohamed turned senior in 2016 and decided to represent Egypt in international competitions. She made her senior debut at the Sidijk Tournament, finishing fourth in the all-around. She competed at the African Championships in Algiers, where she helped Egypt win gold in the team competition. Individually she won gold on floor exercise and placed fourth on the balance beam.  She next competed at the IAG SportEvent in 's-Hertogenbosch where she placed sixth in the all-around. At the Dutch National Championships, Mohamed placed sixteenth in the all-around and fourth on floor exercise. In October Mohamed competed at the Wase Gymcup where she finished second in the all-around behind Naomi Visser. At the Dutch Team Championships, Mohamed helped her club finish first. Mohamed ended the season competing at the Turnkunst International in Hamburg where she helped her team finish third and individually she finished fourth in the all-around.

In 2017 Mohamed competed at the Flanders International Team Challenge, where she helped her team finish fifth. At the Dutch Championships that year Mohamed only competed on balance beam and floor exercise.

2018
Mohamed competed at the Mediterranean Games alongside Sherine El-Zeiny, Farah Hussein, Farah Salem, and Nancy Taman. They finished fourth as a team. Individually Mohamed qualified to the floor exercise final, where she finished fifth.  She next competed at the Paris Challenge Cup where she placed eighth on floor exercise. At the Leverkusen Cup, Mohamed finished first in the all-around and helped her team finish fourth. 

Mohamed was selected to represent Egypt at the 2018 World Championships alongside Farah Hussein, Farah Salem, and Nancy Taman. During qualifications, they finished twenty-fifth as a team, which was Egypt's highest team placement in World Championship history.

2019
Mohamed competed at the African Games along with teammates Farah Hussein, Farah Salem, Zeina Ibrahim, and Nancy Taman. They won gold in the team competition. Individually Mohamed had the third-highest all-around score but did not medal due to teammates Hussein and Salem scoring higher. However, she won gold on the floor exercise and silver on the balance beam behind Hussein.  At the World Championships Mohamed finished 60th in the all-around qualification. Although she didn't qualify to the final, she qualified as an individual to the 2020 Olympic Games.

2021
In June, Mohamed competed at the Cairo World Challenge Cup where she won the bronze medal on floor exercise behind Zója Székely and Diana Varinska and she finished fifth on the uneven bars.  At the Olympic Games Mohamed finished 67th during qualifications.

Competitive history

References

External links
 

2000 births
Living people
Egyptian female artistic gymnasts
Dutch female artistic gymnasts
Sportspeople from Haarlem
African Games medalists in gymnastics
African Games gold medalists for Egypt
African Games silver medalists for Egypt
Gymnasts at the 2020 Summer Olympics
Olympic gymnasts of Egypt
Dutch people of Egyptian descent
Competitors at the 2019 African Games